Liu Bingyan (1915–1998) was a People's Republic of China politician. He was born in Hebei. He was governor of his home province. He was a delegate to the 1st National People's Congress, 5th National People's Congress and 6th National People's Congress.

References 

1915 births
1998 deaths
People's Republic of China politicians from Hebei
Chinese Communist Party politicians from Hebei
Governors of Hebei
Liu
Liu
Liu
Politicians from Baoding
National University of Peking alumni